In aeronautics, spoilerons (also known as spoiler ailerons or roll spoilers) are spoilers that can be used asymmetrically as flight control surfaces to provide roll control.

Operation
Spoilerons roll an aircraft by reducing the lift of the downward-going wing. Unlike ailerons, spoilers do not increase the lift of the upward-going wing. A raised spoileron also increases the drag on the wing where it is deployed, causing the aircraft to yaw. Spoilerons can be used to assist ailerons or to replace them entirely, as in the B-52G which required an extra spoiler segment in place of ailerons present on other B-52 models.

Purpose
Spoilerons do not cause adverse yaw, unlike ailerons.

They are used in situations where aileron action would produce excessive wing twist on a very flexible wing or if wide-span flaps prevent adequate aileron roll control.

They can also be used as spoilers.

The Mitsubishi MU-2 has double-slotted flaps that take-up the full length of the wing, to achieve good STOL performance. This leaves no room for ailerons, so it uses spoilerons instead.

Spoilerons can be used during a stall, whereas ailerons must not be used in a stall because they will have the opposite to intended effect.

Disadvantages
Spoilerons reduce lift, increasing fuel usage. The lift reduction can be a problem in a one-engine inoperative situation.

Examples
An early use of spoilers augmenting small ailerons, known as guide ailerons, was in the Northrop P-61 Black Widow night fighter. The spoilers allowed wider-span flaps for a lower landing speed.

The B-52 Stratofortress also had spoilers augmenting small ailerons, known as feeler ailerons. These ailerons provided control forces to the pilot. The B-52G has no ailerons. The spoilers, situated inboard and forward of the trailing edge, are used for lateral control at high speeds to prevent excessive wing twist.

The Mitsubishi Diamond Jet, Beechjet, and Hawker 400 family of business aircraft incorporate full length spoilerons that also double as speed spoilers during flight and landing.

Another aircraft with full-length double-slotted flaps was the Wren 460. To go with large aileron deflections at low speeds it had a set of 5 feathering drag plates ahead of each aileron to overcome adverse aileron yaw and decrease lift on the low wing.

Boeing's line of jet airliners have flight spoilers which can act as roll spoilers. They are activated automatically when the control wheel is displaced more than 10 degrees.

The Tupolev Tu-154 have fast-acting spoilers. They double as spoilerons that assist the ailerons when the pilot commands a high roll rate. These can be observed in operation when the pilot is fighting gusting crosswinds while landing.

Research 
Several technology research and development efforts exist to integrate the functions of aircraft flight control systems such as ailerons, elevators, elevons, flaps, flaperons, and spoilerons into wings to perform the aerodynamic purpose with the goals of reducing mass, cost, drag, inertia (for faster, stronger control response), complexity (mechanically simpler, fewer moving parts or surfaces, less maintenance), and radar cross section for stealth. Expected applications include many unmanned aerial vehicles (UAVs) and 6th generation fighter aircraft. Two promising approaches are: flexible wings; and fluidics.

Flexible wings
In flexible wings, much or all of a wing surface can change shape in flight to deflect air flow. The X-53 Active Aeroelastic Wing is a NASA effort. The Adaptive Compliant Wing is a military and commercial effort.

Fluidics
In fluidics, forces in vehicles occur via circulation control, in which larger more complex mechanical parts are replaced by smaller simpler fluidic systems (slots which emit air flows) where larger forces in fluids are diverted by smaller jets or flows of fluid intermittently, to change the direction of vehicles. In this use, fluidics promises lower mass, costs (up to 50% less), and very low inertia and response times, and simplicity.

See also
 Flight control surfaces
 Flaperon
 Elevon

References 

Aircraft controls
Aircraft wing design
Aircraft wing components